Red Flag Communist Party may refer to:
 Communist Party of India (Marxist–Leninist) Red Flag, a disbanded communist party in India
 Peruvian Communist Party – Red Flag, a disbanded communist party in Peru
 Red Flag Communist Party (Myanmar), a disbanded communist party in Myanmar (Burma)